Agasthenes may refer to:
 13185 Agasthenes, Jovian asteroid
 Agasthenes, hero from Greek mythology
 Agasthenes (wasp), a genus of wasps